The Black Country Urban Forest (BCUF) is a project to make urban forestry the characteristic landscape of one of England's industrial areas, The Black Country.

It is not a forest in the modern sense of a large area of managed woodland. It is closer to the old concept of a Royal forest – a large area of land with many different land uses and activities, except that instead of being dedicated to the enjoyment of the privileged few, the BCUF is an amenity for all the people, from all backgrounds, that live in it.

Origins
The BCUF resulted from the “Millennium Forest”, the most ambitious urban forestry project ever undertaken in the UK – a huge program of urban tree planting and management of urban woodlands, creating a tremendous increase in the area of woodland in the area.

The Black Country (the part of the West Midlands conurbation consisting of the city of Wolverhampton and the Metropolitan Boroughs of Dudley, Sandwell, and Walsall) was the 'forge' of the Industrial Revolution, and the legacy of this was huge areas of derelict land. Even at the turn of the 19th and 20th centuries the Midland reafforesting association was creating new woodlands on former colliery tips and other suitable sites across the area. At the end of the 20th Century ambitious targets were set and huge increases in planting proposed.

Development
The successful project, “Treeways”, focused on transport corridors in the area, and acted as a pilot. The four voluntary sector principals in this project – National Urban Forestry Unit (NUFU), Wildlife Trust for Birmingham and the Black Country, British Trust for Conservation Volunteers (BTCV) and Groundwork Black Country. They went on to work closely with the four local authorities to propose the ambitious Millennium programme. Despite setbacks, and problems with achieving all the projected outputs, the project was essentially successful, and the concept of the BCUF continues.  

As well as tree planting and woodland management, woodland based businesses were supported, events and activities organised to engage local communities and studies of the area's biodiversity were carried out.

The Millennium Forest project was funded by the UK's Millennium Fund, matched by regeneration funding from the UK government and Europe, grants from the Forestry Commission and many other sources. The total cost was over £7 million.

A similar and wider project was started in 2006/7, the £50m Black Country Urban Park.

Responsibility for the Black Country Urban Forest is now shared between Groundwork Black Country and the landowners, each of whom entered into a 99-year deed of dedication, a legal agreement with the Millennium Commission.

External links
 Wildlife Trust: Black Country Urban Forest (PDF)
 Millennium.gov.uk

Geography of the West Midlands (county)
Forests and woodlands of the West Midlands (county)
Urban forestry organizations
Black Country